Oligolophotes is an extinct genus of fish from the Early Oligocene of the bank of Belaya River in Adygea, the Caucasus Mountains. There is one species, Oligolophotes fragosus, known from the holotype that is estimated to have measured  in body length.

References

Lophotidae
Oligocene fish of Asia
Fossil taxa described in 1999